Columbina is a genus of small doves in the family Columbidae that live in the New World. They range from the southern United States through Central America and much of South America. Columbina doves are normally found in pairs or small flocks and generally occur in open country. They have maroon irides and pinkish legs. In flight, some species show a distinctive flash of rufous in the wings, while others show black-and-white wing-patterns.

The genus was introduced in 1825 by the German naturalist Johann Baptist von Spix. The name is from Latin columbinus meaning "of a dove" or "dove-like". The type species was designated as the C. strepitans by English zoologist George Robert Gray in 1841. This taxon is now considered as a subspecies of the picui ground dove Columbina picui strepitans.

The genus contains nine species:
 Inca dove, Columbina inca
 Scaled dove, Columbina squammata
 Common ground dove, Columbina passerina
 Plain-breasted ground dove, Columbina minuta
 Ecuadorian ground dove, Columbina  buckleyi
 Ruddy ground dove, Columbina talpacoti
 Picui ground dove, Columbina picui
 Croaking ground dove, Columbina cruziana
 Blue-eyed ground dove, Columbina cyanopis

References

 
Bird genera